Dorsum Azara is a wrinkle ridge at  in Mare Serenitatis on the Moon. It is 103 km long and was named after Spanish naturalist Félix de Azara in 1976.

References

External links

Dorsum Azara at The Moon Wiki
LAC-42
LTO-42A3 Banting — L&PI topographic map

Azara
Mare Serenitatis